Sant Nagar (Punjabi-ਸੰਤ ਨਗਰ) is a small town located near village Landhe Ke in the Moga district of Punjab in India. Its ward no is 49. It is located 0.8 kilometre away from Landhe Ke. Sant Nagar is located on Amritsar Road. Which divides the Town in the two Parts. The main religion of people of Sant Nagar is Sikhism.

References

Moga district